is a passenger railway station located in the town of Minami, Kaifu District, Tokushima Prefecture, Japan. It is operated by JR Shikoku and has the station number "M20".

Lines
Only local trains stop at the station.

Layout
The station consists of one side platform serving a single track. There is no station building; however, the platform has a shelter for passengers. A ramp and a flight of steps lead up to the platform from the access road. A bike shed is located near the entrance of the station.

Adjacent stations

History
Japanese Government Railways (JGR) opened Kitagawachi Station on 14 December 1939 with the name . The station was renamed Kitagawachi on 1 October 1959. On 1 April 1987, with the privatization of Japanese National Railways (JNR), the successor of JGR, JR Shikoku took over control of the station.

Surrounding area
Japan National Route 55
Minami Municipal Hiwasa Junior High School

See also
 List of Railway Stations in Japan

References

External links

 JR Shikoku timetable 

Railway stations in Tokushima Prefecture
Railway stations in Japan opened in 1939
Minami, Tokushima